Lady Nelson may refer to:

 Frances Nelson (1758–1831), wife of British admiral Horatio Nelson
 , Royal Navy survey vessel in Australian waters
 , Canadian ocean liner (1928–1968)
  was launched in Bermuda in 1801. She was lost on 15 November 1804 at the Galapagos while whaling.